Jean Boyer (13 February 1901 – 24 November 1981) was a French footballer. He competed at the 1920 Summer Olympics and the 1924 Summer Olympics.

References

External links
 

1901 births
1981 deaths
French footballers
France international footballers
Olympic footballers of France
Footballers at the 1920 Summer Olympics
Footballers at the 1924 Summer Olympics
People from Vitry-sur-Seine
Association football forwards
Footballers from Val-de-Marne
Olympique de Marseille players